Terri Bennett is an Irish former cricketer who played as an all-rounder. She appeared in three One Day Internationals for Ireland in 1990. She played domestic cricket for East Midlands.

References

External links
 
 

Living people
Date of birth missing (living people)
Year of birth missing (living people)
Place of birth missing (living people)
Irish women cricketers
Ireland women One Day International cricketers
East Midlands women cricketers